The 2015 U-19 Asia Rugby Championship is an international rugby union competition for Under 20 national teams in Asia. The winners, Hong Kong, secured a berth at the 2016 World Rugby Under 20 Trophy by winning the top division.

Top division
The top division was hosted by Singapore at the Yio Chu Kang Stadium from 13–19 December 2016.

References

Junior World Rugby Trophy
2015 in Singaporean sport
2015 in youth sport
Asia Rugby Championship